Three steamships operated by Irish Shipping were named Irish Willow.

 – in service 1941–46
 – in service 1948–54
 – in service 1956–59

Ship names